The 2018 UNLV Rebels football team represented the University of Nevada, Las Vegas in the 2018 NCAA Division I FBS football season. The Rebels were led by fourth-year head coach Tony Sanchez and played their home games at Sam Boyd Stadium. They were members of the West Division of the Mountain West Conference. They finished the season 4–8 and 2–6 in Mountain West play to finish in fifth place in the West Division.

Previous season
The Rebels finished the 2017 season 5–7 and 4–4 in Mountain West play to finish in third place in the West Division.

Preseason

Award watch lists
Listed in the order that they were released

Mountain West media days
During the Mountain West media days held July 24–25 at the Cosmopolitan on the Las Vegas Strip, the Rebels were predicted to finish in third place in the West Division.

Media poll

Preseason All-Mountain West Team
The Rebels had one player selected to the preseason all-Mountain West team.

Offense

Lexington Thomas – RB

Schedule

Schedule Source: 2018 UNLV Rebels Football Schedule

Game summaries

at USC

UTEP

Prairie View A&M

at Arkansas State

New Mexico

at Utah State

Air Force

at San Jose State

Fresno State

at San Diego State

at Hawaii

Nevada

References

UNLV
UNLV Rebels football seasons
UNLV Rebels football